Diana Weicker (born 26 May 1989) is a Canadian freestyle wrestler. She competed in the women's freestyle 53 kg event at the 2018 Commonwealth Games, winning the gold medal. In 2021, she won the silver medal in the 53 kg event at the Matteo Pellicone Ranking Series 2021 held in Rome, Italy.

References

External links
 

1989 births
Living people
Canadian female sport wrestlers
Place of birth missing (living people)
World Wrestling Championships medalists
Wrestlers at the 2018 Commonwealth Games
Commonwealth Games gold medallists for Canada
Commonwealth Games medallists in wrestling
Pan American Wrestling Championships medalists
20th-century Canadian women
21st-century Canadian women
Medallists at the 2018 Commonwealth Games